Rani, also known as Raksha, is an Indian actress who appears in Tamil, Telugu, Kannada and Hindi-language films. She is best known for the song "O Podu" from Gemini, sung by Anuradha Sriram and picturised on her, and is often referred to as "O Podu" Rani. She won the Andhra Pradesh government Nandi award for best supporting actress for the film Nachavule (2008)

Filmography

Television

References

External links 

Living people
Actresses in Tamil cinema
Indian film actresses
Actresses in Telugu cinema
Actresses in Kannada cinema
20th-century Indian actresses
21st-century Indian actresses
1974 births
Actresses in Malayalam cinema
Actresses in Tamil television
Actresses in Telugu television